Lucas Eduardo Mancinelli (born 6 July 1989) is an Argentine professional footballer who plays as a midfielder for Deportivo Cuenca.

Career
Mancinelli started his career with Lanús. He joined Atlanta on loan in 2010 and made his debut during the 2010–11 Primera B Metropolitana season, he went on to score four goals in that season which ended with promotion to Primera B Nacional. In June 2011, Mancinelli returned to Argentine Primera División side Lanús. His first appearance for the club arrived on 20 August in a 0–0 draw with San Martín. On 30 September, Mancinelli departed on loan to rejoin Atlanta. He stayed for two seasons and scored three goals in thirty-nine matches. Mancinelli returned to Lanús in June 2013, featuring three times.

Mancinelli left on loan to Ferro Carril Oeste of Primera B Nacional on 30 June 2014. He was sent off in his first start for Ferro Carril Oeste, during a draw away to Instituto. On 5 January 2015, Atlanta signed Mancinelli on loan for a second time. He scored seven goals in forty-five games in 2015, before netting four in nineteen in 2016. July 2016 saw Mancinelli leave Lanús permanently to sign for fellow Primera División team Temperley. After twenty-nine matches and two goals, he left Temperley for Olimpo on 20 July 2017. In July 2018, Mancinelli rejoined Temperley; just relegated to Primera B Nacional.

On 12 June 2019, Mancinelli agreed terms with Primera División side Patronato. Nine appearances followed across the next five months. In January 2020, Mancinelli headed abroad for the first time as he signed with Ecuadorian Serie A side Deportivo Cuenca. He debuted in a home defeat to L.D.U. Quito on 14 February, with his first goals arriving on 1 September as he converted two penalties in a 2–2 draw with Técnico Universitario. He scored five further goals across October and November, which included a further brace against LDU Portoviejo.

Career statistics
.

Honours
Atlanta
Primera B Metropolitana: 2010–11

References

External links

1989 births
Living people
Footballers from La Plata
Argentine footballers
Argentine expatriate footballers
Expatriate footballers in Ecuador
Argentine expatriate sportspeople in Ecuador
Association football midfielders
Argentine Primera División players
Primera B Metropolitana players
Primera Nacional players
Ecuadorian Serie A players
Club Atlético Lanús footballers
Club Atlético Atlanta footballers
Ferro Carril Oeste footballers
Club Atlético Temperley footballers
Olimpo footballers
Club Atlético Patronato footballers
C.D. Cuenca footballers